is a Japanese romance Vocaloid song series by HoneyWorks. The project's first song on Nico Nico Douga was a music video sung by Vocaloid Gumi titled  that was released on November 18, 2011. The songs have spawned into various media forms including manga, novel, and anime adaptations.

Two anime films titled Zutto Mae Kara Suki Deshita and Suki ni Naru Sono Shunkan o were released in 2016. An anime television series by Lay-duce titled Our love has always been 10 centimeters apart aired from November to December 2017. A third anime film titled Kono Sekai no Tanoshimikata: Secret Story Film was released on December 25, 2020. A second anime television series titled Heroines Run the Show aired from April to June 2022.

Plot
The earlier plot of Kokuhaku Jikkō Iinkai tells the love stories of six third year high school students: Natsuki Enomoto, Yu Setoguchi, Sota Mochizuki, Akari Hayasaka, Mio Aida, and Haruki Serizawa. Besides them, the story branches to various other love stories about the people around the original characters. The stories focus on conflict and how hard it can be to confess one's love during youth days.

Characters

Third Year Students

Natsuki is the main protagonist of Zutto Mae Kara Suki Deshita and a boisterous third year student who is friendly to everyone. She is in love with her childhood friend Yu, but she fears that if he rejects her confession, their friendship will be ruined. To save face, she lies to him by stating that he is her practice confession partner.

Natsuki's childhood friend and the president of the Movie Research Club. He is secretly in love with Natsuki, but unsure if the feeling is mutual.

The president of the Art Club. A beautiful and nice, yet sort of clumsy girl, nobody knows what she is actually thinking. Even though she admires the concept of love, she has never experienced falling in love herself.

The vice president of the Movie Research Club and nicknamed "Mochita." He falls in love with Akari and gets easily jealous of other guys approaching her.

Miou is the main protagonist of Itsudatte Bokura no Koi wa 10 cm Datta and the vice president of the Art Club. A gentle, shy, and discreet girl. She is not good at talking with boys, but she gets along with Haruki. As a result of their closeness, they are rumored to be dating. They deny the rumors while struggling to confess their feelings to each other.

, Koinu (childhood)
A member of the Movie Research Club. His blond hair and sharp eyes lead others to believe he is a bad student. He falls in love with Miou and though they act like a couple, they are unable to confess their feelings to each other.

A girl who works as a model outside of school. Unbeknown to Midori, she has noticed him too and wants to talk to him.

A member of the Horticulture Club. A boy with long hair and glasses who changed his appearance during his third year in high school after being teased for his feminine looks. Natsuki never teased him and because of this, he is in love with her, but he is aware of Natsuki and Yu's mutual feelings toward each other.

Haruki's best friend who moved from Kansai before entering high school. He speaks in a Kansai dialect. He recognized Sena on his commute by train to school and has wanted to talk to her, but cannot muster the courage to do so.

First Year Students

Hina is the main protagonist of Suki ni Naru Sono Shunkan o and Yu's younger sister by two years. She styles her pink hair in twin pigtails. During her first year in middle school, she met Koyuki and despite a disastrous first encounter full of misunderstandings, the two became friends and she fell in love with him. She wants to confess her feelings, but she knows that Koyuki is in love with someone else. She later develops feelings for Kotaro and begins dating him in her twenties.

Natsuki's younger brother by two years. He has trouble being honest and his words sometimes end up hurting people. He is in love with Hina, but after he learns that Hina loves Koyuki, he tries to help her with her confession. He and Hina become a couple in their twenties.

A girl with short bangs and a twin-tail hairstyle. In middle school, she helped her classmate from being bullied, but ended up getting bullied herself. She admires Sena and wears her hair the same way Sena does. She disapproves of Ken's womanizing behavior and after criticizing his behavior, he takes an interest in her. She starts to like him, but his flirty ways and many girlfriends discourage her from acting on her feelings.

Kotaro's friend since middle school. He is nicknamed "Shibaken." He has a reputation for being a playboy, but he was actually a shy and sensitive person in elementary school. After Arisa scolds him for his behavior, he begins to rethink himself, realizing that his casual relationships are not serious. He breaks up with his girlfriends, intending to have Arisa as his only focus.

Kotaro and Ken's best friend who loves to read books and seems to be very observant of other people. He secretly has a crush on Natsuki.

New First Year Students

A classmate of the idol group LIPxLIP, and eventually their junior manager and friend. Originally from the countryside, she came to Tokyo for high school and joins the Track and Field Club as Hina's junior. She has her own desire to be treated like a princess and falls in love with the princely idol Asuka Kaido at a bookstore. Her feelings are not reciprocated. She is hardworking, but goes at her own pace.

A member of the idol group LIPxLIP. His mother married into a prestigious Kabuki theater line, but he himself was rejected as the heir in favor of his younger stepbrother Koichiro. Shares a friendly rivalry with his idol partner Aizo, although they did not get along at first.

An up-and-coming, hard-working solo idol, using the stage name "mona". She is a rival of the idol group LIPxLIP. She gets supported by her older sister, Sena Narumi, to whom she looks up to.

Ken Shibasaki's younger brother, a member of the idol group LIPxLIP. He does not like his older brother or mother, the latter because she neglects both brothers and abuses him, and the former for his womanizing. Shares a friendly rivalry with his idol partner Yujiro, but comes to see him as an important friend. His main solo song is "YELLOW".

A bubbly gyaru Hiyori befriends in her time at Sakuragaoka High School.

A quiet and bookish girl who befriends Hiyori and Juri.

Other Characters

A teacher at Sakuragaoka Academy and the advisor of Movie Research Club. He was Chiaki's best friend and has known Haruki since childhood. Since Chiaki's death, his relationship with Haruki has been strained. His main subject is literature and he always wears a white coat so his clothes do not get dirty.

Haruki's late older brother and Saku's best friend. He died due to his illness. He saved Miou from drowning when she was younger.

A sports-type girl. Younger sister of the Sakuragaoka faculty member Hiro Ogino. She is a varsity volleyball player, the best in her team, and is admired by her female juniors. While there's not a lot of information on her, she seems to have a connection with Koyuki Ayase.

A cat-like boy who also performs as a YouTuber and occasionally as an idol. Has a crush on Nakuru, a girl he collaborated with for a music video, but when he confesses he is rejected by her and asked to remain friends. Is friends with the LIP×LIP duo.

Discography

Singles

Albums

Anime adaptations

Films

The first film titled Zutto Mae Kara Suki Deshita opened in Japan on April 23, 2016. The film is based on the songs "Kokuhaku Yokō Renshū," "Hatsukoi no Ehon," and "Yakimochi no Kotae," which tell the third year students' love stories. The opening theme performed by CHiCO is titled  and the ending theme performed by Sphere is titled "Ippun'ichibyō Kimi to Boku no."

The second film Suki ni Naru Sono Shunkan o opened in Japan on December 17, 2016. The film is based on the songs "Ima Suki ni naru" and "Sankaku Jealousy," which tell the love story of Hina Setoguchi, Kotaro Enomoto, and Koyuki Ayase. The opening sung by TrySail is titled "Senpai." and the ending song titled "Daikirai na Hazudatta." is performed by Sayuringo Gundan + Manatsu-san Respect Gundan from Nogizaka46.

Both films are produced by Qualia Animation with direction and scripts respectively by Tetsuya Yanagisawa and Yoshimi Narita. Maki Fujii serves as character designer adapting Yamako's art and as chief animation director. HoneyWorks serves as a music producer.

In August 2020, HoneyWorks announced a new anime film with the members of LIPxLIP as the main characters. Titled Kono Sekai no Tanoshimikata: Secret Story Film, the film is a part of HoneyWorks' 10th anniversary project. It is produced by CLAP and directed by Fumie Moroi, with scripts written by Yoshimi Narita, character designs by Miwa Oshima, and music composed by Moe Hyūga alongside HoneyWorks. The film was released in Japan on December 25, 2020. The opening song is "Love & Kiss" and the ending song is "Kono Sekai no Tanoshimikata," both performed by LIPxLIP.

Television series

Our love has always been 10 centimeters apart (2017)
In March 2017, an anime television special was announced on the official HoneyWorks Twitter account. The series titled  was broadcast for six weeks starting on November 24, 2017 on Tokyo MX and BS11. The story focuses on Mio Aida and Haruki Serizawa with new elements added to the plot; the series adapts the songs "Hatsukoi Ehon" and "Ippun'ichibyō Kimi to Boku." The animation is produced by Lay-duce while Takurō Tsukada serves as the director and Hitoshi Nanba serves as the chief director. The group LIPxLIP, composed of Kōki Uchiyama and Nobunaga Shimazaki, performs the opening theme . The main cast members as their characters (Haruka Tomatsu as Natsuki Enomoto, Hiroshi Kamiya as Yu Setoguchi, Yūki Kaji as Sota Mochizuki, Kana Asumi as Akari Hayasaka, Kenichi Suzumura as Haruki Serizawa, and Aki Toyosaki as Mio Aida) perform the ending theme . The final episode features a song performed by Aki Toyosaki under her character name Mio Aida titled . Aniplex of America has licensed the series for a North American release. Crunchyroll holds the rights for online streaming. On August 24, Funimation announced they would add the show to their catalog the next day.

Heroines Run the Show (2022)

In August 2021, a second anime television series titled Heroines Run the Show: The Unpopular Girl and the Secret Task was announced. The story focuses on Hiyori Suzumi and her journey to becoming the junior manager of LIPxLIP. The series is produced by Lay-duce and directed by Noriko Hashimoto, with scripts written by Yoshimi Narita, character designs by Kaori Ishii, and music composed by Moe Hyūga. It aired from April 7 to June 23, 2022.

Other media

Light novels
A light novel series adaptation is published by Kadokawa Shoten's Kadokawa Beans Bunko. The volumes are written by Tōko Fujitani up to volume 6, and then Mari Kōsaka from volume 7 onwards. Illustrations were solely done by Yamako up to volume 9, but later only provides the color illustrations; the duty is taken up by Ruia Shimakage from volume 10 onwards.

Video game
A smartphone app game titled HoneyWorks Premium Live based on HoneyWorks' songs was announced alongside plans for the television anime. The game eventually was released as part of HoneyWorks' HoneyWorks Atelier project to celebrate their tenth active year, and was delayed to 2020. It was released on November 18, 2020, the 9th anniversary of their PV for "Hatsukoi no Ehon", and was developed by Akatsuki Inc.

The game is a rhythm game that prominently features the primary cast of Kokuhaku Jikkō Iinkai, both in-story and sharing the majority of songs available for the game.

Notes

References

External links

HoneyWorks official website 
Anime official website 
Kokuhaku Jikkō Iinkai ~Ren'ai Series~ at Kadokawa Beans Bunko 

2017 anime television series debuts
2010s romance films
2014 Japanese novels
2016 anime films
Animated romance films
Aniplex
Films based on songs
Kadokawa Beans Bunko
Lay-duce
Light novels
Japanese romance films
Romance anime and manga
Creative works using vocaloids